This is a list of things named after Sir Isaac Newton.

Science and mathematics
 Newtonianism, the philosophical principle of applying Newton's methods in a variety of fields

Mathematics

Physics

Places

Schools

Artwork

Other

See also
 Newtonian (disambiguation)

Newton
Newton
Named after